Ryan R. Johnson is an American independent film producer who is the current president of production and a principal at Sprockefeller Pictures. He has also founded or been an executive at various other production and distribution companies including Pretty Dangerous Films, The Film House, Night Fox Entertainment and Mandalay Pictures. Over the course of his career, he has produced, executive produced or developed dozens of films, including Enemy at the Gates, Chasing 3000, Arkansas, and numerous others.

Life and career
 
Ryan R. Johnson grew up in Boise, Idaho. He attended Whittier College in California, graduating in 1996. He started his career in the entertainment industry in the 1990s as the stunt double for the Green Ranger on the Mighty Morphin Power Rangers TV series. In 1997, he earned a job at Mandalay Pictures, where he eventually worked his way up to an executive position. While there, he worked as a development associate on films like Sleepy Hollow and Enemy at the Gates. In 2003, he formed his own production company, Pretty Dangerous Films, where he served as president and CEO. As head of that company, he produced a number of films, including Chasing 3000, The Heart Is Deceitful Above All Things, and Edmond. He also produced and wrote the screenplay for the 2005 film, The Curse of El Charro.
 
In 2015, he partnered with Martin Sprock to create Sprockefeller Pictures, another production company. In 2013, he founded The Film House, a film distributor and production company based in upstate New York. Johnson served as president and CEO of that company. Also in 2013, he was named the president of production at Night Fox Entertainment. Through these production entities, he has served as producer on many films, including Z for Zachariah (2015), 9/11 (2017), Hooking Up (2020), and numerous others.

Filmography

Film

Television

References

External links
Night Fox Entertainment
Sprockefeller Pictures

Year of birth missing (living people)
Living people
Whittier College alumni
American film producers